Carlos Garay (born February 9, 1972) is a former American football quarterback who played three seasons in the Arena Football League with the New Jersey Red Dogs, Grand Rapids Rampage and Carolina Cobras. He played college football at Hofstra University.

References

External links
Just Sports Stats

Living people
1972 births
American football quarterbacks
Hofstra Pride football players
New Jersey Red Dogs players
Grand Rapids Rampage players
Carolina Cobras players